Bredicot railway station served the village of Bredicot, Worcestershire, England, from 1845 to 1855 on the Birmingham and Gloucester Railway.

History 
The station was opened in November 1845 by the Birmingham and Gloucester Railway. It closed on 1 October 1855.

References 

Disused railway stations in Worcestershire
Railway stations in Great Britain opened in 1845
Railway stations in Great Britain closed in 1855
1845 establishments in England
1855 disestablishments in England